Darnell Bing (born September 10, 1984) is a former American football linebacker. He was drafted by the Oakland Raiders in the fourth round of the 2006 NFL Draft. He played college football at Southern California.

Bing has also been a member of the San Francisco 49ers, New York Jets and Detroit Lions.

Early years
Bing attended Long Beach Polytechnic High School. He was a part of a Poly team that had five players ranked in the top 100 in the nation according to Rivals.com: tight end Marcedes Lewis, offensive tackle Winston Justice, defensive tackle Manuel Wright, running back Hershel Dennis and himself. Bing was a member of the USC football team in college along with all of these high school teammates, except for Lewis who played for USC's crosstown archrival, UCLA.

College career
Bing played safety for the USC Trojans, and received permission from USC athletic director Mike Garrett (USC's 1965 Heisman Trophy-winning tailback) to wear Garrett's retired No. 20 jersey. He was ruled academically ineligible his first year, but Bing started on all three other years of his collegiate career and was on two national championship teams. He was named a Jim Thorpe Award finalist as the nation's best collegiate football defensive back and an All-American in 2005.  He was an early entry candidate in the 2006 NFL Draft, winding up in the fourth round.

In his final season at Southern California, Bing had an interception in the final minutes of the game against Fresno State that sealed the win for the Trojans.

Awards and honors
 Honorable mention All-Pac-10 (2003)
 Sporting News Pac-10 Freshman of the Year (2003)
 Sporting News Freshman All-American (2003)
 Second-team All-Pac-10 (2004)
 First-team All-Pac-10 (2005)
 First-team AP All-American (2005)
 Jim Thorpe Award semifinalist (2005)
 Lott Trophy quarterfinalist (2005)

Professional career

Oakland Raiders
He was drafted by the Oakland Raiders with the 101st pick of the 2006 NFL Draft. Although he was a safety in college, the Oakland Raiders planned to convert him to an outside linebacker, but before the 2007 season they moved him back to safety. Prior to the 2006 season, the Raiders placed Bing on the injured reserve list with a neck injury. On July 25, 2007 the Raiders released him.

San Francisco 49ers
The San Francisco 49ers claimed Bing off waivers on July 26, 2007. They released him on September 1 and re-signed him to the practice squad, where he spent the entire 2007 season.

New York Jets
On January 9, 2008, the New York Jets signed Bing to a future contract. He was waived by the team on July 29.

Detroit Lions
Bing was signed by the Detroit Lions on August 4, 2008 after the team placed linebacker Teddy Lehman on injured reserve. As the Raiders had unsuccessfully tried, the Lions also converted him to linebacker.  He began the season on the team's practice squad before being promoted to the active roster on December 8, 2008 when linebacker Alex Lewis was placed on injured reserve.  He was released on October 6, 2009.

Houston Texans
Bing signed a contract for the 2010 season on January 8, 2010. He was released at the end of the preseason and signed to the practice squad on October 14. On February 18, 2011, Bing was released from the Texans roster.

References

External links

Detroit Lions bio
Houston Texans bio
USC Trojans bio

1984 births
Living people
Players of American football from Long Beach, California
American football safeties
American football linebackers
USC Trojans football players
Oakland Raiders players
San Francisco 49ers players
New York Jets players
Detroit Lions players
Houston Texans players
Long Beach Polytechnic High School alumni